Gary Pethybridge (born 6 November 1950) is an Australian former rugby league footballer who played in the 1970s.

Career

Pethybridge was a Parramatta junior and was graded with the Parramatta Eels in 1970.

By 1973 he had moved to St. George Dragons and he had a wonderful season in his debut year at Saints which included one representative match for New South Wales in the same year. He helped steer the Dragons into the semi-finals in 1973 and a bright career looked certain, but he suffered a chronic neck injury caused by being kneed in the back in 1974 that derailed his career at St. George and he virtually retired. He returned from injury three years later with the Penrith Panthers and he played three seasons with them between 1978-1980 and captained the club before retiring for good in 1981.

References

1950 births
Living people
Australian rugby league players
Parramatta Eels players
Penrith Panthers players
Penrith Panthers captains
New South Wales rugby league team players
Rugby league centres
Rugby league players from Sydney
St. George Dragons players